La Brea (Spanish for "the tar" or "the tar pits") may refer to:

Los Angeles 

 La Brea Avenue
 La Brea Bakery
 La Brea Tar Pits
 Park La Brea, Los Angeles, a large apartment community

Elsewhere 

 La Brea, Trinidad and Tobago, home to the Pitch Lake
 La Brea District, in Peru

Other 
 La Brea (TV series), an American drama television series